Milton George Gustavus Sills (January 12, 1882 – September 15, 1930) was an American stage and film actor of the early twentieth century.

Biography
Sills was born in Chicago, Illinois, into a wealthy family. He was the son of William Henry Sills, a successful mineral dealer, and Josephine Antoinette Troost Sills, an heiress from a prosperous banking family. Upon completing high school, Sills was offered a one-year scholarship to the University of Chicago, where he studied psychology and philosophy. After graduating, he was offered a position at the university as a researcher and within several years worked his way up to become a professor at the school. 

In 1905, stage actor Donald Robertson visited the school to lecture on author and playwright Henrik Ibsen and suggested to Sills that he try his hand at acting. On a whim, Sills agreed and left his teaching career to embark on a stint in acting. Sills joined Robertson's stock theater company and began touring the country. 

In 1908, while Sills was performing in New York City, he attracted the notice of Broadway producers such as David Belasco and Charles Frohman. That same year he made his Broadway debut in This Woman and This Man. From 1908 to 1914, Sills appeared in about a dozen Broadway shows.

In 1912, Sills joined the Summer Stock cast at the Elitch Theatre. Owner and producer of the theatre, Mary Elitch Long, reported: "Milton Sills, one of the most charming young men I ever knew, came as my leading man, and Louise Woods as leading lady, for a limited engagement."

In 1910, Sills married English stage actress Gladys Edith Wynne, a niece of actress Edith Wynne Matthison. The union produced one child, Dorothy Sills; Gladys filed for divorce in 1925. In 1926, Sills married silent film actress Doris Kenyon with whom he had a son, Kenyon Clarence Sills, born in 1927.

Motion pictures

In 1914, Sills made his film debut in the big-budget drama The Pit for the World Film Company and was signed to a contract with film producer William A. Brady. Sills made three more films for the company, including The Deep Purple opposite Clara Kimball Young.

By the early 1920s, Sills had achieved matinee idol status and was working for various film studios, including Metro Pictures, Famous Players-Lasky, and Pathé Exchange. In 1923 he was Colleen Moore's leading man in the very successful Flaming Youth, but his biggest box office success was The Sea Hawk (1924), the top-grossing film of that year. in 1925, Sills and his wife, Doris Kenyon, starred in The Unguarded Hour for First National Pictures. In 1926 he wrote the screenplay for Men of Steel, also starring in it along with Kenyon.

Sills had begun to make the transition to sound pictures as early as 1928 with the part-talking The Barker. His final appearance was in the title role of The Sea Wolf (1930), a performance called "incisive"  by The New York Times.

Death and legacy

Sills died unexpectedly of a heart attack in 1930 while playing tennis with his wife at his Brentwood home at the age of 48. He was interred at Rosehill Cemetery and Mausoleum in Chicago. In December 1930, Photoplay published a poem found among his personal effects.

He was a founding member in 1913 of Actors' Equity. On May 11, 1927, he was among the original 36 individuals in the film industry to found the Academy of Motion Picture Arts and Sciences (AMPAS), a professional honorary organization dedicated to the advancement of the arts and sciences of motion pictures.

Sills also wrote a book, published posthumously in 1932: Values: A Philosophy of Human Needs – Six Dialogues on Subjects from Reality to Immortality, co-edited by Ernest Holmes.

For his contribution to the motion picture industry, Milton Sills received a star on the Hollywood Walk of Fame at 6263 Hollywood Boulevard. Sills was the favorite actor of poet Weldon Kees as a child, and Sills' Men of Steel influenced Kees' poem "1926".

Filmography

The Pit (1914) as Corthell
The Deep Purple (1915) as William Lake
The Arrival of Perpetua (1915) as Thaddeus Curzon
Under Southern Skies (1915) as Burleigh Mavor
The Rack (1915) as Tom Gordon
Patria (1917) as Capt. Donald Parr
The Honor System (1917) as Joseph Stanton
Souls Adrift (1917) as Micah Steele
Married in Name Only (1917) as Robert Worthing
The Fringe of Society (1917) as Martin Drake
Diamonds and Pearls (1917) as RobertVan Ellstrom
The Other Woman (1918) as Mr. Harrington
The Struggle Everlasting (1918) as Mind, aka Bruce
The Reason Why (1918) as Lord Tancred
The Mysterious Client (1918) as Harry Nelson
The Yellow Ticket (1918) as Julian Rolfe
The Claw (1918) as Major Anthony Kinsella
The Savage Woman (1918) as Jean Lerier
The Hell Cat (1918) as Sheriff Jack Webb
Shadows (1919) as Judson Barnes
Satan Junior (1919) as Paul Worden
The Stronger Vow (1919) as Juan Estudillo
The Hushed Hour (1919) as Luke Appleton
The Woman Thou Gavest Me (1919) as Conrad
The Fear Woman (1919) as Robert Craig
Eyes of Youth (1919) as Louis Anthony
What Every Woman Learns (1919) as Walter Melrose
The Street Called Straight (1920) as Peter Devenant
The Inferior Sex (1920) as Knox Randall
Dangerous to Men (1920) as Sandy Verrall
The Week-End (1920) asArthur Tavenor
Behold My Wife! (1920) as Frank Armour
Sweet Lavender (1920) as Horace Weather Burn
The Furnace (1920) as Keene Mordaunt
The Faith Healer (1921) as Michaelis
The Little Fool (1921) as Dick
Salvage (1921) as Fred Martin
The Great Moment (1921) as Bayard Delaval
At the End of the World (1921)
Miss Lulu Bett (1921) as Neil Cornish
A Trip to Paramountown (1922, Short)
One Clear Call (1922) as Dr. Alan Hamilton
The Woman Who Walked Alone (1922) as Clement Gaunt
Borderland (1922) as James Wayne
Burning Sands (1922) as Daniel Lane
Skin Deep (1922) as Bud Doyle
The Forgotten Law (1922) as Richard Jarnette
Environment (1922) as Steve MacLaren
The Marriage Chance (1922) as William Bradley
The Last Hour (1923) as Steve Cline
What a Wife Learned (1923) as Rudolph Martin
The Isle of Lost Ships (1923) as Frank Howard
Legally Dead (1923) as Will Campbell / George Brown
The Spoilers (1923) as Roy Glennister
Adam's Rib (1923) as Michael Ramsay
Why Women Remarry (1923) as Dan Hannon
Flaming Youth (1923) as Cary Scott
Souls for Sale (1923) as Himself (uncredited)
A Lady of Quality (1924) as Gerald Mertoun, Duke of Osmonde
The Heart Bandit (1924) as John Rand
Flowing Gold (1924) as Calvin Gray
The Sea Hawk (1924) as Sir Oliver Tressilian
Single Wives (1924) as Perry Jordan
Madonna of the Streets (1924) as Reverend John Morton
As Man Desires (1925) as Major John Craig
I Want My Man (1925) as Gulian Eyre
The Making of O'Malley (1925) as O'Malley
The Knockout (1925) as Sandy Donlin
A Lover's Oath (1925) -- editor
The Unguarded Hour (1925) as Andrea
Puppets (1926) as Nicki
Men of Steel (1926) as Jan Bokak
Paradise (1926) as Tony
The Silent Lover (1926) as Count Pierre Tornal
The Sea Tiger (1927) as Justin Ramos
Framed (1927) as Etienne Hilaire
Hard-Boiled Haggerty (1927) as Hard-Boiled Haggerty
The Valley of the Giants (1927) as Bryce Cardigan
Burning Daylight (1928) as Elam 'Burning Daylight' Harnish
The Hawk's Nest (1928) as The Hawk / John Finchley
The Crash (1928) as Jim Flannagan
The Barker (1928) as Nifty Miller
His Captive Woman (1929) as Officer Thomas McCarthy
Love and the Devil (1929) as Lord Dryan
Man Trouble (1930) as Mac
The Sea Wolf (1930) as 'Wolf' Larsen (final film role)

References

External links

Photographs and literature
"The Actor's Part", article written by Sills in 1927

1882 births
1930 deaths
Academy of Motion Picture Arts and Sciences founders
American male film actors
American male silent film actors
American male stage actors
Burials at Rosehill Cemetery
Male actors from Chicago
University of Chicago alumni
University of Chicago faculty
20th-century American male actors
People from Brentwood, Los Angeles